Sleepy Cat Peak, elevation , is a summit in the Flat Tops of northwest Colorado. The mountain is east of Meeker in the White River National Forest of Rio Blanco County.

See also

List of Colorado mountain summits
List of Colorado county high points

References

Mountains of Colorado
Mountains of Rio Blanco County, Colorado
North American 3000 m summits